Mario René Junior Lemina (born 1 September 1993) is a Gabonese professional footballer who plays as a central midfielder for Premier League club Wolverhampton Wanderers.

He played for French sides Lorient and Marseille, before joining Italian side Juventus in 2015, where he won the domestic double in both of his seasons with the club. He joined English side Southampton in 2017, and was later loaned out to Turkish club Galatasaray in 2019. After a loan to Fulham in England, he joined French club Nice in 2021. In January 2023, he returned to England after signing for Wolverhampton Wanderers.

A former French international at youth level, Lemina went on to represent Gabon at senior level, making his senior international debut in 2017. He later represented Gabon at the 2017 and 2021 Africa Cup of Nations.

Club career

Early career
Lemina began his youth career in France aged 7 at local club ES Nanterre; he then went to study sports at Rueil-Malmaison, finishing at Colombes. Aged 15, he signed with the Lorient youth academy; he was later promoted to the first team during the 2012–13 season, his only season with the club.

Marseille

The following season, Marseille acquired Lemina for €4 million, although he initially struggled to gain playing time in his first year with the club, making only eight league starts during the 2013–14 season. He began to be used more frequently by manager Marcelo Bielsa during the 2014–15 season, making his breakthrough with the club, as he helped the team to a fourth-place finish, earning 23 appearances in the league. In February 2015, Lemina was sent off for a punch to the groin of Ola Toivonen in a 1–1 Ligue 1 away draw against Rennes.

Juventus
During the summer of 2015, Lemina began to attract the attention of several clubs, including Premier League clubs Liverpool, Southampton and West Ham United. On 31 August, however, the last day of the transfer window, Juventus announced the signing of Lemina on a season-long loan for €500,000 with an option to buy for €9.5 million at the end of the 2015–16 season. On 26 September 2015, he scored his first goal for Juventus in his third appearance, coming in the 63rd minute of a 2–1 away loss to Napoli.

On 29 April 2016, Lemina's loan was made permanent; he signed a four-year deal from Marseille for a fee of €9.5 million plus an extra €1 million if performance related targets are met. The deal was scheduled to keep him at Juventus until 2020. On 21 May, Lemina started in the Coppa Italia Final, playing the full match as Juventus defeated AC Milan 1–0 after extra time to capture the domestic double for the second consecutive season.

Southampton

On 8 August 2017, Lemina joined Southampton on a five-year deal for a club record fee of £15.4m. He made his debut on 20 August, in a 3–2 victory over West Ham United. His first goal for Southampton came in a 3–2 victory over fellow strugglers West Bromwich Albion on 3 February.

Loan to Galatasaray
In 2019–20 season, Lemina joined Galatasaray on a loan deal.

Loan to Fulham
On 30 August 2020, Lemina was loaned out to Fulham with an option to buy. He made his debut for the club on 16 September 2020 in the second round of the EFL Cup against Ipswich Town, which Fulham won 1–0. On 7 March 2021, Lemina scored his first Fulham goal to seal a 1–0 away win over Liverpool, handing them their sixth consecutive league defeat at Anfield for the first time in the Reds' history. In doing so, Lemina also clinched Fulham's second win at Liverpool in the club's history.

Nice 
On 24 July 2021, Lemina joined Nice for an undisclosed fee.

Wolverhampton Wanderers 
On 13 January 2023, Lemina joined Wolverhampton Wanderers for an undisclosed fee on a two and a half year deal. He made his first appearance on 14 January 2023 as a substitute in a home Premier League game against West Ham, a fixture which Wolves won 1–0.

Lemina made his full Wolves debut on 22 January 2023 in a 3–0 loss at Manchester City and then his full home debut on 4 February, helping the hosts to defeat Liverpool, also by a 3–0 scoreline.

On Lemina's fourth appearance for his new side on 11 February, he was sent off in the first-half of Wolves's Premier League game away to Lemina's former club, Southampton, for receiving two yellow cards. Wolves went on to win the game 2–1 despite playing for more than an hour with 10-men.

International career
Lemina had been called by the Gabon national team to participate in the 2015 African Cup of Nations, but he refused his call-up. Although he had initially represented France's under-20 and under-21 sides, also winning the 2013 FIFA U-20 World Cup at youth level, he formally switched to the Gabonese Federation on 2 June, and is now a formal member of the Gabon national team.

He scored on his international debut, in a 3–3 friendly draw against Tunisia on 9 October 2015. Lemina took part at the 2017 Africa Cup of Nations, which was held on home soil. He started in Gabon's opening match of the tournament on 14 January – a 1–1 draw against Guinea-Bissau – but later suffered a back-injury, however, which ruled him out of the remainder of the tournament.

On 17 January 2022, Lemina announced his retirement from the Gabon national team. He had just been released by Gabon following a heart complication due to COVID-19, leaving in the middle of the 2021 Africa Cup of Nations tournament.

Style of play
A strong, powerful, hard-working, and dynamic right-footed midfielder, with good technical skills and solid distribution, Lemina is a box-to-box player who is usually deployed in the centre, due to his ability to start attacking plays after winning back possession. Described as a "classy and tenacious midfielder," due to his tactical versatility, he is capable of playing in several positions, and has been deployed as a winger, as a full-back, or as a wing-back, on the right flank; during his time with Marseille, he also played as centre-back in a three-man defence on occasion, during the 2014–15 season, under manager Marcelo Bielsa. He also been deployed as a playmaker on occasion. Despite his talent, he has also earned a reputation for having a temper and for lacking concentration at times.

Career statistics

Club

International

Scores and results list Gabon's goal tally first, score column indicates score after each Lemina goal.

Honours
Juventus
 Serie A: 2015–16, 2016–17
 Coppa Italia: 2015–16, 2016–17
 UEFA Champions League runner-up: 2016–17

Nice
Coupe de France runner-up: 2021–22

France U20
 FIFA U-20 World Cup: 2013

See also

References

External links

 Profile at the Wolverhampton Wanderers F.C. website
 
 
 
 

1993 births
Living people
Sportspeople from Libreville
French sportspeople of Gabonese descent
French footballers
Gabonese footballers
Association football midfielders
FC Lorient players
Olympique de Marseille players
Juventus F.C. players
Southampton F.C. players
Galatasaray S.K. footballers
Fulham F.C. players
OGC Nice players
Wolverhampton Wanderers F.C. players
Championnat National 2 players
Ligue 1 players
Championnat National 3 players
Serie A players
Premier League players
Süper Lig players
France youth international footballers
France under-21 international footballers
Gabon international footballers
2017 Africa Cup of Nations players
2021 Africa Cup of Nations players
French expatriate footballers
French expatriate sportspeople in Italy
French expatriate sportspeople in England
French expatriate sportspeople in Turkey
Gabonese expatriate footballers
Gabonese expatriate sportspeople in Italy
Gabonese expatriate sportspeople in England
Gabonese expatriate sportspeople in Turkey
Expatriate footballers in Italy
Expatriate footballers in England
Expatriate footballers in Turkey
Black French sportspeople